The 1970 Stanford Indians football team represented Stanford University during the 1970 NCAA University Division football season.

Season
The Indians were 8–3 in the regular season and won the Pac-8 title by two games; their only conference loss was at rival California in the Big Game on November 21. In the Rose Bowl in Pasadena on New Year's Day, they upset #2 Ohio State.

With eighteen passing and three rushing touchdowns added to his 2,715 passing yards on the year (which broke his own conference record), Rose Bowl MVP Jim Plunkett was awarded the Heisman Trophy. The 1970 college season had been the "Year of the Quarterback," and Plunkett beat out Notre Dame's Joe Theismann and Archie Manning of Ole Miss to win the award.

Plunkett was the first Latino to win the Heisman Trophy; he also captured the Maxwell Award for the nation's best quarterback and was named player of the year by United Press International, The Sporting News, and SPORT magazine. In addition, the American College Football Coaches Association designated him as their Offensive Player of the Year.

Plunkett was the first overall pick of the 1971 NFL Draft, selected by the Boston Patriots; the team relocated to the new Schaefer Stadium in Foxborough before the 1971 season began and became the New England Patriots.

Schedule

Roster

NFL Draft
Five Stanford players were selected in the 1971 NFL Draft

Awards and honors
 Jim Plunkett, Heisman Trophy
 Jim Plunkett, Walter Camp Award
 Jim Plunkett, Maxwell Award

References

External links
 Game program: Stanford vs. Washington State at Spokane – October 17, 1970

Stanford
Stanford Cardinal football seasons
Pac-12 Conference football champion seasons
Rose Bowl champion seasons
Stanford Indians football